The National Renewal Movement (MORENA) was a political party in Paraguay. It contested the 1998 general elections, finishing fourth in the Senate and Chamber of Deputies elections with 1.5% and 1.1% of the vote, but failing to win a seat in either. The party did not contest any further elections.

References

Defunct political parties in Paraguay